Ian William Edward Stokes (born 22 February 1964) is a former English cricketer.  Stokes was a left-handed batsman.  He was born in Solihull, Warwickshire.

Stokes made his debut for Staffordshire in the 1997 MCCA Knockout Trophy against Buckinghamshire.  Stokes played Minor counties cricket for Staffordshire from 1997 to 1998, which included 6 Minor Counties Championship matches and 4 MCCA Knockout Trophy matches.  In 1997, he made his List A debut against Nottinghamshire in the NatWest Trophy.  He played a further List A match against Leicestershire in the 1998 NatWest Trophy.  In his 2 List A matches, he scored 22 runs at an average of 11.00, with a high score of 18.

References

External links
Ian Stokes at ESPNcricinfo
Ian Stokes at CricketArchive

1964 births
Living people
Sportspeople from Solihull
English cricketers
Staffordshire cricketers